Gladys Mbulaheni is a South African Naval officer, serving as the Chief of Naval Staff from 1 June 2020.

She is the first woman to hold the rank of Rear Admiral in the South African Navy.

Qualifications 
 BA degree in government administration and development
 Postgraduate diploma in security studies
 Pursuing an MBA degree

References

South African admirals
People from Soweto
Living people
Year of birth missing (living people)